Nikola Buranská is a Czech beauty pageant titleholder who was crowned Česká Miss Earth 2014 and represented the Czech Republic at Miss Earth 2014. She won alongside Gabriela Franková and Tereza Skoumalová. Nikola is partly of  Greek heritage for her great grandfather came from Greece.

Biography

Early life and career beginnings
Buranská came from Přerov where she graduated high school. She went to Liberec  where she studies at Metropolitan University Prague taking up Public Administration. Nikola also speaks English and German languages because she believes in the saying, "How many words you know , the more of a person you are". She wants to learn in the future other languages like Italian and Spanish.

She is in a relationship with Filip Novák, a famous football player in Czech Republic. They are in a relationship since 2010 and been living together since 2011.

Nikola also worked as a model in Milan, London and in Paris.

Pageantry

Česká Miss 2012
Nikola first tried her luck in the world of pageantry via Česká Miss but she was unplaced.

Česká Miss 2014
Nikola once again tried to become a beauty queen again at Česká Miss. But this time, she won the internet votes that gave her the right to earn the title of Blesk Česka Miss Earth 2014. Weeks before the finals night, Nikola suffered from her injured foot where she got while they were in Mauritius. The doctor almost had to put injections that eventually did not get to materialize.

Miss Earth 2014

By winning Miss Earth Czech Republic, Nikola flew to the Philippines in November to compete with almost 100 other candidates to be Alyz Henrich's successor as Miss Earth.

As a Miss Earth delegate, an environmental advocacy is must. When she was asked about her advocacy for the pageant, she answered, "For a cleaner and healthier world, I'm willing to give up everything that negatively affects the environment – I personally use public transport, which certainly promotes healthier air in the city where I live." Nikola also added, "Ecological lifestyle means for me regular waste management, use of public transport, limiting the use of household chemicals when cleaning, organic food shopping in specialty stores or at farmers markets."

When she was asked about what to promote in her country, Czech Republic, Nikola answered her country's architecture and history. Nikola also said that Czech Republic is surrounded by "...mountains, nature preserves and national parks." She also mentioned about her people's kind hearts and traditions that they love to show to all people from different walks of life. 

At the conclusion of the pageant, she was unplaced. The Miss Earth 2014 title was won by Jamie Herrell of the Philippines.

References

Czech beauty pageant winners
1992 births
Living people
People from Přerov
Czech people of Greek descent
Miss Earth 2014 contestants
Czech female models